Pineau is a French surname. 

Notable people with the surname include:
Allison Pineau, (born 1989) French handballer and Olympic silver medallist
Carol Pineau, American journalist and producer, writer, and director of documentary films
Cédric Pineau, (born 1985) French former road bicycle racer
Christian Pineau, (1904–1995) French Resistance fighter and Minister of Foreign Affairs
Cleo Francis Pineau, (1893–1972) American World War I flying ace
Franck Pineau, (born 1963) French former racing cyclist
Gisèle Pineau, (born 1956) French novelist, writer and former psychiatric nurse
Henry Pineau, (1863–1904) Canadian conservative politician
Jacinthe Pineau, (born 1974) Canadian former competition swimmer
Jérôme Pineau, (born 1980) French former professional road bicycle racer
Joëlle Pineau, Canadian computer scientist and associate professor at McGill University
Nicolas Pineau, (1684–1754) French carver and ornamental designer, who developed the Rococo style
Paul Pineau, (1923–2006) French racing cyclist